The Neosho County Panthers are the sports teams of Neosho County Community College located in Chanute, Kansas, United States. They participate in the National Junior College Athletic Association (NJCAA) and in the Kansas Jayhawk Community College Conference.

Sports

Men's sports
Baseball
Basketball
Soccer
Track & field
Wrestling

Women's sports
Basketball
Soccer
Softball
Track & field
Volleyball

Facilities
Neosho County Community College facilities are listed below.
 Hudson Field – home of the Panthers baseball team
 Soccer Complex – home of the Panthers soccer and track & field teams

References

External links
 

Sports teams in Kansas